Nii Gyashie Bortey Acquaye (born 12 February 1999) is a Ghanaian footballer who currently plays as a defender for Ghana Premier League side WAFA.

Career 
Acquaye started his senior career with West African Football Academy in October 2018. During the 2019 GFA Normalization Competition, on 31 March 2019, he made his debut by playing the full 90 minutes in a 3–1 win against Liberty Professionals. On 5 May 2019, he scored his debut goal by scoring in the 72nd minute to help WAFA to a 3–2 home victory over Accra Hearts of Oak. At the end of the competition, he had featured in 11 matches and scored 1 goal. During the 2019–20 season, he played just a match but appeared on the bench for 14 other matches before the league was brought to an abrupt end due to the outbreak of COVID-19 in Ghana.

References

External links 
 

Living people
1999 births
Association football defenders
Ghanaian footballers
West African Football Academy players
Ghana Premier League players